The Mountains and Rivers Order of Zen Buddhism (MRO) is an organization of associated temples, practice centers and sitting groups in the United States and abroad. The main house is the Zen Mountain Monastery located at the foot of Mount Tremper in the Catskill Mountains of New York, and also includes the Zen Center of New York City in downtown Brooklyn, and affiliate groups. The MRO was founded by Zen Master John Daido Loori, Roshi, in 1980. It is inspired by the teachings of Zen Master Dōgen as presented in his "Mountains and Rivers Sutra" (Sansui kyō). The current head of the order is Geoffrey Shugen Arnold, Roshi.

References

External links
Mountains and Rivers Order of Zen Buddhism website

Buddhist organizations based in the United States
Non-profit organizations based in New York (state)
Religious organizations established in 1980
1980 establishments in New York (state)
1980 establishments in the United States
Buddhist orders
Schools of Buddhism founded in the United States